Muzaffar Shah Qadri is a Pakistani Sunni Islamic scholar and the son of sufi saint Nobat Ali Shah Qadri. He is a Friday preacher at the Jama Masjid Habibiya, the Chairman of the Jazba Welfare Trust, and a leader of the Ahle Sunnat wal jamaat.

Barelvi movement
Shah supports the Barelvi movement and raises various issues with Barelvi scholars. He claims that the movement is actually a name given to the Sunni majority on the Indian subcontinent, who adhere to the teachings of Ahmed Raza Khan.
He delivers video and audio speeches.

Protest against SIC leader Mehboob's death
He and other Sunni leaders asked the Government to investigate Mehboob's death in Rangers’ custody.

References

Living people
Pakistani Sunni Muslim scholars of Islam
Year of birth missing (living people)
Barelvis
Islam in Pakistan